The Journal of Clinical Oncology is a peer-reviewed medical journal published 3 times a month by the Lippincott Williams & Wilkins. It covers research on all aspects of clinical oncology. The journal was established in 1983 and the editor-in-chief is Jonathan W. Friedberg (University of Rochester). JCO's Impact Factor is 44.544 as reported by Clarivate in its 2020 Journal Citation Reports.

History 
In 1981 Emil Frei III proposed that the American Society of Clinical Oncology should publish an official journal and that it should be called Journal of Clinical Oncology. The first issue was published on January 1, 1983, containing 70 pages of research and an editorial by the then editor-in-chief, Joseph Bertino. Bertino was succeeded by George P. Canellos in 1987. In 1998, a Spanish language edition of the journal started quarterly publication, followed by a Chinese language edition. Currently there are 10 international editions. Daniel Haller became editor-in-chief in 2001 and during his tenure the journal moved from its publisher Grune & Stratton to in-house publication by society staff.  Stephen A. Cannistra was editor-in-chief from 2011 to 2021.

Abstracting and indexing 
This journal is abstracted and indexed in:
 Science Citation Index
 Neuroscience Citation Index
 Current Contents/Clinical Medicine
 Current Contents/Life Sciences
 Index medicus/MEDLINE/PubMed
 Embase/Excerpta Medica
 Chemical Abstracts Service
 CINAHL

See also
JCO Clinical Cancer Informatics
Journal of Oncology Practice

References

External links 
 

Publications established in 1983
Oncology journals
English-language journals
Academic journals published by learned and professional societies
Journals published between 27 and 51 times per year